Walrus Island is one of the uninhabited Canadian arctic islands in the Kivalliq Region, Nunavut. It is located within western Hudson Bay.

References

Islands of Hudson Bay
Uninhabited islands of Kivalliq Region